= Teresa Lagergård =

Polish medical researcher

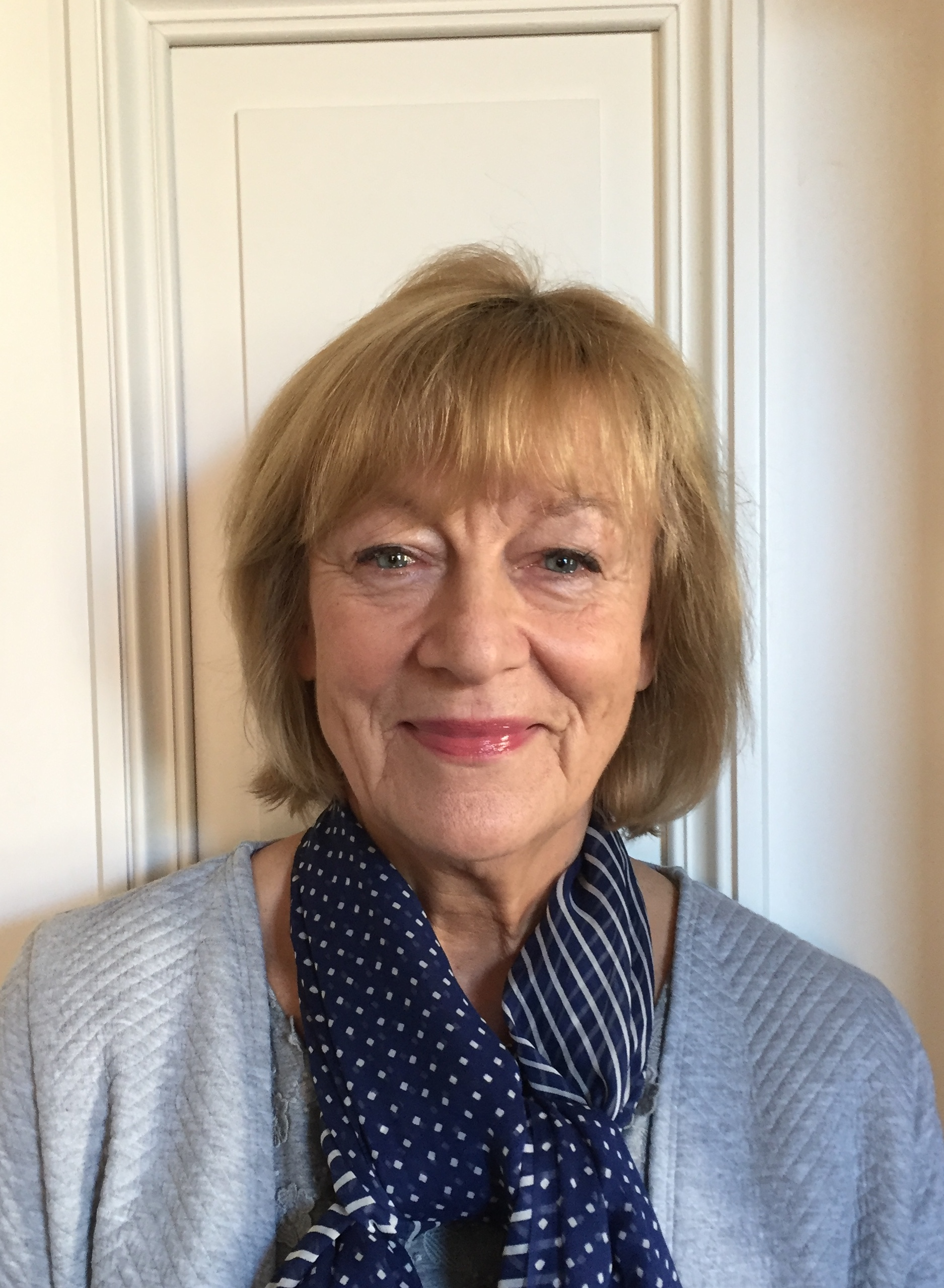
- Education: University of Warsaw; University of Gothenburg
- Known for: bacterial virulence factors; mechanisms of infection; infections immunology
- Scientific career
- Fields: Microbiology
- Workplaces: University of Gothenburg
- Thesis: Antibodies to Haemophilus influenzae and their bactericidal activity

Teresa Lagergård (Lenartowicz) was born 1946 in Sosnowiec, Poland. She is professor emerita at University of Gothenburg, Sahlgrenska Academy, Institute of Biomedicine, Department of Microbiology and Immunology.

== Education ==
Lagergård holds an MA from University of Warsaw, Department of Biology and Ph.D. from Goteborg University, with thesis “Antibodies to Haemophilus influenzae and their bactericidal activity” (Ph.D. in Microbiology). She was 1988-1989 a post-doc at the National Institutes of Health (NIH), National Institutes of Childhood and Development (NICHD) in Bethesda, USA.

== Research ==
Lagergård continued research collaboration for many years with researchers from the NIH and USA. She also was involved in research studies and collaborated with scientists from Poland, Tanzania, South Africa and Kina.

Her main field of research include investigation of bacterial virulence factors, mechanisms of infection, infections immunology, vaccines and vaccine development. Main focus was on such bacteria as Haemophilus influenzae, H. ducreyi, and Streptococcus sp. Bordetella pertussis 1. She was a full professor of biomedicine at Mucosal Immunology and Vaccine Center in Gothenburg.

Lagergård is an author of more than 100 scientific publications, including chapter is scientific books within field of microbiology, infection, immunology and vaccine.

Lagergård is also an author of two books about her polish family: Postcards from grandfather Józef and Women in my family. She is a member of the Royal Society of Art and Sciences in Gothenburg (KVVS).
